Daria Kinzer (born 29 May 1988) is a Croatian-Austrian singer who represented Croatia in the Eurovision Song Contest 2011 in Germany. Kinzer won the national selection on 5 March with her entry "Celebrate", and took part in the first semifinal night of the Contest finishing at 15th place. She has also recorded a German version of the "Celebrate" song, entitled "Diese Nacht". (English lyrics for "Diese Nacht" by Daria Kinzer)

Kinzer was born in to a Croatian mother and German father, but she also speaks Croatian. She studies in Vienna.

References

External links 
 

1988 births
21st-century Croatian women singers
Croatian pop singers
Croatian people of German descent
People from Aschaffenburg
Eurovision Song Contest entrants of 2011
Eurovision Song Contest entrants for Croatia
Living people
21st-century Austrian women singers
Musicians from Vienna